Vebjørn Turtveit (born 12 August 1994) is a Norwegian cross-country skier.

He competed in one event at the 2013 Junior World Championships, recording a 13th place in the skiathlon. He made his World Cup debut in February 2016 in Oslo, also breaking the top 30-barrier with a 25th place in the Holmenkollen Ski Festival's 50 kilometre race. In December 2018 he collected his next World Cup points, at Beitostølen, later improving his career best placement to 8th in February 2019 in Cogne. In 2019 he also improved to a 17th place in the Holmenkollen 50 km.

He represents the sports club Voss IL.

Cross-country skiing results
All results are sourced from the International Ski Federation (FIS).

World Cup

Season standings

References 

1994 births
Living people
People from Voss
Norwegian male cross-country skiers
Sportspeople from Vestland